Crassula setulosa is a species of stonecrop that is found mostly in eastern South Africa and Lesotho.

Description

Range

Habitat

Ecology

Etymology

Taxonomy
Crassula setulosa contains the following varieties:
 Crassula setulosa var. deminuta
 Crassula setulosa var. longiciliata
 Crassula setulosa var. jenkinsii
 Crassula setulosa var. rubra
 Crassula setulosa var. setulosa

References

setulosa